The Little Black River Archeological District, in Butler County, Missouri near Naylor, Missouri, is a  historic district that was listed on the National Register of Historic Places in 1975.  The listing included three contributing buildings, five contributing structures, and 260 contributing sites.

It includes the McCarty-Moore Site and is listed for its potential to yield information in the future.

It is located on Sharecropper, Harris, and Mackintosh Ridges. It includes hundreds of Mississippian archaeological sites, many of them small.

References

Further reading
 O'Brien, Michael J.  Mississippian Community Organization: The Powers Phase in Southeastern Missouri.  New York, Boston, Dordrecht, London, and Moscow: Kluwer Academic/Pluwer, 2001

Archaeological sites in Missouri
Historic districts on the National Register of Historic Places in Missouri
National Register of Historic Places in Butler County, Missouri
National Register of Historic Places in Ripley County, Missouri